The 2021–22 Southern Miss Lady Eagles basketball team represents the University of Southern Mississippi during the 2021–22 NCAA Division I women's basketball season. The team is led by eighteenth-year head coach Joye Lee-McNelis, and plays their home games at the Reed Green Coliseum in Hattiesburg, Mississippi as a member of Conference USA.

On October 28, 2021, Southern Miss announced that this will be the last season for the team in the C-USA and become the Sun Belt Conference on July 1, 2022.

Schedule and results

|-
!colspan=12 style=|Exhibition

|-
!colspan=12 style=|Non-conference regular season

|-
!colspan=12 style=|CUSA regular season

|-
!colspan=12 style=| C-USA Tournament

See also
 2021–22 Southern Miss Golden Eagles basketball team

Notes

References

Southern Miss Lady Eagles basketball seasons
Southern Miss
Southern Miss Lady Eagles basketball
Southern Miss Lady Eagless basketball